Rancid is the debut studio album by the American punk rock band Rancid. It was released on May 10, 1993, through Epitaph Records.

It is the only album to feature the band as a trio (guitarist/vocalist Lars Frederiksen would later join the band for the album's supporting tour), as well as one of three albums not to be produced by Brett Gurewitz (the others being ...And Out Come the Wolves and Life Won't Wait). However, Gurewitz provided backing vocals on the album.

It was also the second of three self-titled releases, the others being the group's debut extended play (1992) and its fifth studio album (2000). This album has been dubbed "Rancid Rancid."
Until 2017's Trouble Maker, this was the only Rancid album not to feature their iconic logo on the cover. In 2019, the Brooklyn Vegan ranked the album as their 6th best album.

Reception

Mike DaRonco of AllMusic stated "This is where it all starts. Without any reminiscing about their former band, Operation Ivy, Matt Freeman (bass) and Tim Armstrong (guitar/vocals) blast through their debut without any hints of ska or blatant Clash plagiarizing. On the contrary, this album rips through 15 tracks of high-energy punk that's accompanied by heavy bass leads and Armstrong's permanently slurred vocals. And to top it all off, the lyrical content deals with urban blight and the lifestyle of being a public nuisance. With this trademark sound, Rancid provide the perfect soundtrack for any car chase that includes massive property damage; is it a wonder MTV wouldn't touch this?"

Track listing

Personnel
 Tim Armstrong – vocals, guitars
 Matt Freeman – bass guitar, vocals
 Brett Reed – drums, backing vocals

Additional musicians
 Jeff Abarta; Jay Bentley; Brett Gurewitz; Eric Martini - backing vocals
 Beth Oiler - congas
 Donnell Cameron - maracas

Production
 Donnell Cameron - producer
 Chris Brooke; Michael Ewing; Jeff Peccerillo; Eric Martini - engineers
 Tracy Cox - cover art
 Mackie McAller - artwork
 Kathy Bauer - photography

Album notes
 A music video was made for the track "Hyena".
 "Union Blood", the album's fifteenth track, is a hidden track and not mentioned on the back cover.
 "Get Out of My Way", the album's final song, is a cover, originally performed by The Uptones.
 The album insert thanks Lars Frederiksen, who joined the band prior to Rancid'''s release. As such, out of respect to what they had done before him and so not as to take any credit for it, he does not appear in the liner notes for the album.
 The album thanks Billie Joe Armstrong and his band Green Day. Billie Joe Armstrong would later co-write the song "Radio", which is featured on Rancid's second studio album Let's Go.
 The album also thanks Buzz Osborne and Lori Black of the Melvins.
 The album also thanks The Offspring and NOFX, who were both labelmates with Rancid and would tour and achieve success together.
 Bad Religion members Brett Gurewitz and Jay Bentley make a guest appearance on the album. Brett is the owner of the album's label Epitaph and would produce and engineer their later albums.
 The album thanks Tom Radner, Tony "Blue Shorts" Villis, and Robb Flynn and his band Machine Head as Rob Machinehead. Rancid was also thanked in the booklet of Machine Head's 1994 debut Burn My Eyes.
 The tracks "Adina" and "The Bottle" were featured in the Adam Rifkin film The Chase'' in 1994.

References

Rancid (band) albums
1993 debut albums
Epitaph Records albums